Don't Pretend may refer to:

 "Don't Pretend", a 2019 song by Khalid from Free Spirit
 "Don't Pretend", a 2010 song by Travie McCoy from Lazarus